The Arab–Israeli normalization refers to the peace efforts and treaties between the member states of the Arab League and Israel, ending the Arab–Israeli conflict. Since the 1970s, there has been a parallel effort made to find terms upon which peace can be agreed to in the Arab–Israeli conflict and also specifically the Israeli–Palestinian conflict. Over the years numerous Arab League countries have signed peace and normalization treaties with Israel, beginning with the Egypt–Israel peace treaty (1979). Despite the failure to implement the Israeli-Lebanese peace accords (1983), more treaties continued with the Israeli-Palestinian peace process (1991-present), the Jordan–Israel peace treaty (1994), the Abraham Accords normalizing relations between Israel-United Arab Emirates and Israel-Bahrain (2020), the Israel–Sudan normalization agreement (2020) and the Israel–Morocco normalization agreement (2020). Moreover, numerous Arab League members established semi-official relations with Israel.

Cease fire attempts and indirect negotiations (1949-1974)

1949 cease fire and Lausanne conference

1967 UN resolution

1973-74 UN resolutions and cease fire agreements

Egyptian-Israeli peace treaty (1978-79)

Israeli-Lebanese normalization attempt (1983)

Israeli-Palestinian peace process

Israel-Jordan peace treaty (1994)

Israeli normalization with Gulf and North Africa Arab states (2017-present)

The Arab–Israeli alliance against Iran emerged by November 2017, upon warming ties between Israel and the Gulf States and received broad media attention in light of the February 2019 Warsaw Conference. The coordination is taking place in light of the mutual regional security interests of Israel and Sunni Arab States led by Saudi Arabia, and their standoff against Iranian interests across the Middle East - the Iran–Israel proxy conflict and the Iran–Saudi Arabia proxy conflict. The Arab states participating in the coordination group are the core of the Gulf Cooperation Council. Those include Saudi Arabia, United Arab Emirates and Oman. In 2018, Israeli Prime Minister Benjamin Netanyahu led a delegation to Oman and met with Sultan Qaboos and other senior Omani officials.

In February 2020, Israeli Prime Minister Benjamin Netanyahu and the Chairman of the Sovereignty Council of Sudan, Abdel Fattah al-Burhan, met in Uganda, where they both agreed to normalize the ties between the two countries. Later that month, Israeli planes were allowed to fly over Sudan. This was followed by the Abraham Accords, signed by Israel and the United Arab Emirates in August 2020 which normalized relations between the two countries. Concurrently, Israel agreed to suspend plans for the annexation of the Jordan Valley. This normalization agreement was followed by official confirmation of the one with Sudan, as well as others with Bahrain and Morocco. On May 31, 2022, Israel and the United Arab Emirates signed a free trade agreement, the first of its kind between Israel and an Arab state.

See also
List of Middle East peace proposals

References

Arab–Israeli conflict
Arab–Israeli peace process